Bagno may refer to:

Places

Poland
Bagno, Lower Silesian Voivodeship (south-west Poland)
Bagno, Kuyavian-Pomeranian Voivodeship (north-central Poland)
Bagno, Białystok County in Podlaskie Voivodeship (north-east Poland)
Bagno, Łomża County in Podlaskie Voivodeship (north-east Poland)
Bagno, Mońki County in Podlaskie Voivodeship (north-east Poland)
Bagno, Łódź Voivodeship (central Poland)
Bagno, Lublin Voivodeship (east Poland)
Bagno, Konin County in Greater Poland Voivodeship (west-central Poland)
Bagno, Lubusz Voivodeship (west Poland)
Bagno, Warmian-Masurian Voivodeship (north Poland)
Bagno, West Pomeranian Voivodeship (north-west Poland)

Elsewhere
Bagno (L'Aquila), a frazione in Abruzzo, Italy
Santa Maria al Bagno, a town in Italy
Steinfurter Bagno, a park in Westphalia, Germany

Other
Bill Bagno, a character in Third and Indiana

See also
Bagnio